Mirjam Orsel (born 1 April 1978 in Amsterdam, North Holland) is a volleyball player from the Netherlands, who plays as a middle-blocker. She was a member of the Dutch National Women's Team that won the gold medal at the FIVB World Grand Prix 2007 in Ningbo, PR China.

References
FIVB profile

1978 births
Living people
Dutch women's volleyball players
Sportspeople from Amsterdam
Middle blockers